Aditi Paul is an Indian playback singer. She is the playback voice behind the song Ang Laga De Re From the Hindi movie Goliyon Ki Raasleela Ram-Leela, Veeron ke Veer Aa from Baahubali 2: The Conclusion, En Kadhaal from Tamil film Vaaraayo Vennilaave, En Mannava (Tamil Version) and Vo Manmadhaa (Telugu Version) from Rajinikanth starrer multilingual film Lingaa under the music direction of A. R. Rahman, Beliya from the film Mehrunisa V Lub U (Duet With Armaan Malik), Nadaniyan Kar Jati Hain, Khwabon Ko Ankhon Mein and anha Tanha Ghum Ke Dhunde Dil (Duet with Jubin Nautiyal) from the film Dil Jo Na Keh Saka and many more. In the debut season of Indian Idol in 2004, Aditi Paul was among the top 10 leading participants. She performs Live regularly in India and Abroad with her band.

Early life and background
Born in Kolkata, her proficiency in singing was discovered by her parents at a very young age. Her entry into singing happened at a very early age through the hands of her mother. Her Aunt and Pt. Ajoy Chakraborty disciples of Ustad Munawar Ali Khan Sahab were her main inspiration. As she grew up she started her formal training of Classical Bengali Songs at the hands of Pt. Ajoy Chakraborty. She is currently training under Bhavdeep Jaipurwale in Mumbai.

References

External links
 
 Official Website

Living people
Bollywood playback singers
Indian women playback singers
21st-century Indian women singers
21st-century Indian singers
1979 births
Indian Idol participants
Women musicians from West Bengal